Brodetske is an urban-type settlement in Khmilnyk Raion of Vinnytsia Oblast in Ukraine. It is located on the banks of the Hnylopiat, a left tributary of the Teteriv in the drainage basin of the Dnieper. Brodetske belongs to Hlukhivtsi settlement hromada, one of the hromadas of Ukraine. Population: 

Until 18 July 2020, Brodetske belonged to Koziatyn Raion. The raion was abolished in July 2020 as part of the administrative reform of Ukraine, which reduced the number of raions of Vinnytsia Oblast to six. The area of Koziatyn Raion was merged into Khmilnyk Raion.

Economy

Transportation

The settlement is on Highway M21 which connects Vinnytsia and Zhytomyr.

References

Urban-type settlements in Khmilnyk Raion